Gerald Kereti Merito (b Whakatane, August 16, 1938, married twice, d Waihoa, January 26, 2009), was a New Zealand singer and guitarist, and one of the original members of the Howard Morrison Quartet.

Merito was a farm boy from Whakatane and a Tuhoe tribe member.

In 1999 Merito received the Benny Award from the Variety Artists Club of New Zealand Inc, the highest honour available to a New Zealand variety entertainer.

He died aged 70, after playing at the Waihau Hotel. Merito has two sons, Daniel and Ben and his wife Dorothy Ohlson.

References

External links
AudioCulture profile

1938 births
2009 deaths
New Zealand guitarists
New Zealand male guitarists
Ngāi Tūhoe people
People from Whakatāne
20th-century guitarists
20th-century male musicians